Forkhead box protein E1 is a protein that in humans is encoded by the FOXE1 gene.

Location 
The FOXE1 gene is located on the long (q) arm of chromosome 9 at position 22

Function 
This intronless gene belongs to the forkhead family of transcription factors, which is characterized by a distinct forkhead domain. This gene functions as a thyroid transcription factor which likely plays a crucial role in thyroid morphogenesis.

Clinical significance 
Mutations in this gene cause Bamforth-Lazarus syndrome and are associated with congenital hypothyroidism and cleft palate with thyroid dysgenesis. The map localization of this gene suggests it may also be a candidate gene for squamous cell epithelioma and hereditary sensory neuropathy type I.

The region surrounding the FOXE1 gene has shown association in the pathogenesis of cleft lip and palate with genome-wide levels of significance in linkage analysis studies with additional fine-mapping and replication.

Tissue localization 
FOXE1 is expressed transiently in the developing thyroid and the anterior pituitary gland.

Avian FOXE1 is also expressed in developing feathers.

See also
 FOX proteins

References

Further reading

External links 
 
 
 

Forkhead transcription factors